Cestus, in a general sense meant, for ancient Greeks and Romans, any band or tie.

However, it was more frequently used to refer to:
 The Girdle of Aphrodite
 Boxing gloves used by ancient Greeks and Romans, also written Caestus
 A girdle or belt worn by women in ancient Greece
 A marriage girdle, given by a newly married wife to her husband

See also 
 Cestvs: The Roman Fighter, anime and manga series about a roman cestus boxer

References

External links
A Latin Dictionary
An Elementary Latin Dictionary
Harpers Dictionary of Classical Antiquities 
A Dictionary of Greek and Roman Antiquities
An Intermediate Greek-English Lexicon
Collins Online Dictionary, Cestus

Belts (clothing)
Roman-era clothing